Lamoureux is a hamlet in central Alberta, Canada within Sturgeon County.

The area was settled in 1872 by the brothers Joseph and Francois Lamoureux. They built a gristmill, a lumber mill, and other industries.  A post office was established shortly after February 1896.  For the fiscal year ending October 1895, the lumber mill was the most productive in the Edmonton area, producing $15 588.65 of lumber (about $377 505 in 2022 Canadian dollars).

Demographics 
The population of Lamoureux according to the 2008 municipal census conducted by Sturgeon County is 60.

See also 
List of communities in Alberta
List of hamlets in Alberta

References 

Hamlets in Alberta
Sturgeon County